Hemiprotosuchus is an extinct genus of protosuchid from the Late Triassic (Norian stage) Los Colorados Formation of the Ischigualasto-Villa Unión Basin in northwestern Argentina, South America. It was named by Argentinian paleontologist José Bonaparte in 1969. The type species is H. leali.

References

External links 
 Hemiprotosuchus in the Paleobiology Database

Triassic crocodylomorpha
Norian life
Late Triassic reptiles of South America
Triassic Argentina
Fossils of Argentina
Los Colorados Formation
Fossil taxa described in 1968
Taxa named by José Bonaparte
Prehistoric pseudosuchian genera